The 1986–87 Eredivisie season was the 27th season of the Eredivisie, the top level of ice hockey in the Netherlands. Six teams participated in the league, and the Rotterdam Panda's won the championship.

Regular season

Playoffs

External links
Nederlandse IJshockey Bond

Neth
Eredivisie (ice hockey) seasons
Ere